The following sortable table comprises the 26 ultra-prominent summits of México.  Each of these peaks has at least  of topographic prominence.

The summit of a mountain or hill may be measured in three principal ways:
The topographic elevation of a summit measures the height of the summit above a geodetic sea level.
The topographic prominence of a summit is a measure of how high the summit rises above its surroundings.
The topographic isolation (or radius of dominance) of a summit measures how far the summit lies from its nearest point of equal elevation.

Pico de Orizaba exceeds  of topographic prominence, Popocatépetl exceeds , and Nevado de Colima exceeds .  Seven mountain peaks of México exceed , the following 26 ultra-prominent summits exceed , and 42 summits exceed  of topographic prominence.



Ultra-prominent summits

Of these 26 ultra-prominent summits of Mexico, four are located in Puebla, four in Oaxaca, four in Nuevo León, three in México, three in Jalisco, two in Veracruz, two in Michoacán, two in Baja California Sur, two in Coahuila, and one each in Morelos, Guerrero, Baja California, Tlaxcala, and Querétaro.  Four of these peaks lie on a state border.

Gallery

See also

List of mountain peaks of North America
List of mountain peaks of Greenland
List of mountain peaks of Canada
List of mountain peaks of the United States
List of mountain peaks of México

List of extreme summits of México
List of mountain peaks of Central America
List of mountain peaks of the Caribbean
Mexico
Geography of Mexico
:Category:Mountains of Mexico
commons:Category:Mountains of Mexico
Physical geography
Topography
Topographic elevation
Topographic prominence
Topographic isolation

Notes

References

External links

Natural Resources Mexico (NRC)
Geographical Names of Mexico @ NRC
peakbagger.com
peaklist.org
summitpost.org
World Mountain Encyclopedia @ peakware.com

 
Lists of mountains of Mexico
Geography of Mexico
Mexico, List Of The Ultra-Prominent Summits Of